106 & Park is  an American hip hop and R&B music video show, set up in a countdown format, that was broadcast on weekdays at 6:00 pm ET/5:00 pm CT on BET; it aired on a one-day delay on BET International. It was the network's highest-rated show throughout its run. On November 14, 2014, BET cancelled 106 & Park, with an alleged shift to a digital-only format, with occasional specials during network event programming, though the last time it was seen in any form was the 2016 BET Experience, and the digital-only program never aired.

Location
The show was originally produced in Harlem, New York City, and the title of the show is derived from the original studio location, NEP's Metropolis Studios, at East 106th Street and Park Avenue. In 2001, Viacom's acquisition of BET prompted a change to the CBS Broadcast Center at 524 West 57th Street between 10th & 11th Avenues, in the Hell's Kitchen section of Midtown Manhattan, turning its title into a misnomer for the rest of its history.

Hosts

A. J. & Free (2000–2005)
A. J. Calloway and Marie "Free" Wright were the original hosts of the show from September 11, 2000 until July 28, 2005, when Calloway announced that it would be his last show, as well as for Free (who spoke via phone), as the show was either presented by Calloway or Wright.

Julissa & Big Tigger (2005–2006)
On August 1, 2005 106 & Park presented by television personality and model Julissa Bermudez and Rap City: Tha Basement'''s Big Tigger until July 3, 2006 as temporary replacements for the show until they find another female co-host for Terrence J Around this time, Terrence J would be guest co-host the show with Julissa. Celebrities (Bow Wow and Mýa) hosted the show as well.

Terrence J & Rocsi (2006–2012)
On July 6, 2006, Rocsi (Raquel Diaz), then an afternoon host for Chicago's radio station WPWX (92.3), and Terrence J (Terrence Jenkins) became the hosts after winning BET's "New Faces" contest. On May 29, 2012, Rocsi and Terrence J announced they would be leaving 106 & Park in 2012. Thus beginning a nationwide search for the next hosts of 106 & Park, which started on June 1, 2012 and ended on October 1, 2012. Terrence J and Rocsi's last episode as hosts was broadcast on September 28, 2012. The announcement for the new hosts of 106 & Park was broadcast on Monday.

The highly anticipated farewell episode aired on September 28, 2012, and was hosted by La La Anthony and Pooch Hall. In the taped video messages, several celebrities wish their farewell for Terrence J and Rocsi. They included Jim Jones, French Montana, Julissa and Big Tigger, 2 Chainz, Ace Hood, Alicia Keys, Amar'e Stoudemire, Big Sean, B.o.B, Bobby V., Brandy Norwood, Busta Rhymes, Cassidy, Ciara, Common, Doug E. Fresh, DMX, Dwyane Wade, Elle Varner, E-40, Future, Jacob Latimore, Keke Palmer, Mary J. Blige, MGK, Mike Epps, Ne-Yo, Shannon Brown and Monica, Stalley, Rick Ross, Robin Thicke, T.I., Wyclef Jean and Bow Wow.

Bow Wow & "The Search" (2012–2013)
On October 1, 2012, the new hosts for 106 & Park were announced, including Shad "Bow Wow" Moss, Jordan "Shorty da Prince" Johnson, Kimberly "Paigion" Walker and Mykel "Miss Mykie" Gray. For the first time in the show's 12-year history, there were officially four hosts for 106 & Park, instead of two. On January 15, 2013, 106 & Park revealed a new set, graphics, logo, and theme music. On January 23, 2013, former host Rocsi Diaz made an unannounced appearance on the show. New segments included "The Mykie Report", "The Battle of the Sexes", "Girl Chat", "Inside the Rapper's Studio", "Virtually Famous" and other shows with 106 & Park guest correspondent "Franky J" in future works. On July 3, 2013, after several weeks of rumors and speculation about the fates of Johnson, Walker and Gray returning to the show, BET released a statement confirming the news that they would not return to the show. The hosts had never appeared on the show in the nearly two months since May 2013. Bow Wow remained as a permanent host on the show with Angela Simmons serving as a temporary co-host for the summer, her last day was on September 30, 2013, along with special guest co-hosts such as Adrienne Bailon.

Bow Wow & Keshia Chanté (2013–2014)
On September 27, 2013, Canadian rapper Drake made the official announcement that Bow Wow would be joined by another Canadian Keshia Chanté as the official new co-host, who would officially start on October 1, 2013. On November 14, 2014, BET cancelled 106 & Park. The show aired its final episode on December 19, 2014.

Broadcasting history
The show launched as an hour-long show before expanding to 90 minutes in 2001. In 2008, the show was expanded to two hours with occasional 90-minute episodes during event weeks. The show celebrated its 2,000th episode on August 20, 2008. From July 25, 2011 to September 2, 2011, the show was expanded to three hours.

The show's 10th anniversary special was on October 6, 2010. The previous hosts, A. J. Calloway & Free (original; 2000–2005), Julissa & Big Tigger (2005–2006) returned to the show to celebrate along with current hosts Terrence J and Rocsi.

The show's final episode ("The Final Act") was on December 19, 2014. The previous hosts, A. J. Calloway & Free (original; 2000–2005), Julissa & Big Tigger (2005–2006), Terrence J & Rocsi (2006–2012) and Shorty da Prince, Paigion and Miss Mykie of "The Search" (2012–2013) returned to the show to honor with current hosts Bow Wow and Keisha Chanté with a special guest appearance by Keyshia Cole.

Freestyle Friday
One popular segment, Freestyle Friday, featured two aspiring rappers competing in a freestyle battle before the studio audience and celebrity judges, alternating for 30 seconds in each of two rounds.

BET Experience
The show returned during the 2015 BET Experience from Los Angeles. It was hosted by Ray J and Tinashe on June 26, 2015, and Yara Shahidi, Marcus Scribner and Keshia Chanté on June 27, 2015. It returned again in 2016 for the last time.

106 & Park Video Hall of Fame
As with TRLs "Retirement Home", a video which appeared on the countdown 65 times would be retired from further countdown consideration and be placed into the "106 & Park Video Hall of Fame". This normally occurred frequently, and earned Bow Wow the permanent title of Mr. 106 & Park, and Aaliyah (died in 2001) the permanent title of Miss 106 & Park for having the most #1's of their respective genders. The final video to be retired was "Ridin'" by Chamillionaire featuring Krayzie Bone on December 19, 2014.

Reception
In 2016, a New York Times study of the 50 TV shows with the most Facebook likes found that 106 & Park'' "is popular in the New York metro area, generally"

Criticism
In December 2022, claims were made by former music manager Jermaine Dupri that he created the broadcast to showcase more hip-hop talent in similarity to pop culture solicited on the previous TRL. He goes on to say he created the show for Bow Wow, an artist he managed years prior, however, this has since been renounced by former 106 & Park producer Stephen G. Hill who shared on Twitter ‘..our memories on 106 & Park differ GREATLY’ and ‘..NO ONE challenges that Bow Wow helped launch 106 to great heights…that is for sure true. But “CREATED BY ME” might be a bit of an overstep..’  Bow Wow initially tweeted in response to his since-retired manager ‘Stop the cap’ as well as follow-ups crediting Stephen Hill, Rick Grimes, ‘..& all the great people in the BET OFFICE & staff created that show. All i did was capitalize off of what they created and made it mine. I would know…. I am mr 106! I would never take away from someones creativity.’

See also
 106 & Gospel
 Freestyle Friday

References

External links
 
 106 & Park Connect
 

 
2000 American television series debuts
2000s American music television series
2010s American music television series
2014 American television series endings
BET original programming
English-language television shows
Hip hop television
Pop music television series